is a Japanese speed skater who competed in the 1994 Winter Olympics.

She was born in Shiraoi, Hokkaido and is the wife of Takeshi Yamanaka.

In 1994 she won the bronze medal in the 5000 metres event. In the 3000 metres competition she finished seventh and in the 1500 metres contest she finished 15th.

External links 
 profile

1970 births
Japanese female speed skaters
Speed skaters at the 1994 Winter Olympics
Olympic speed skaters of Japan
Medalists at the 1994 Winter Olympics
Olympic medalists in speed skating
Olympic bronze medalists for Japan
Sportspeople from Hokkaido
Living people
Speed skaters at the 1990 Asian Winter Games
20th-century Japanese women
21st-century Japanese women